Joan Pitcock (born July 12, 1967) is an American professional golfer who played on the LPGA Tour.

Pitcock has won once on the LPGA Tour in 1996.

At the 1991 U.S. Women's Open, Pitcock was the co-leader after 54 holes. Pitccock then shot a final round 75 and finished tied for 7th.

Amateur wins
1983 California Junior Girls' State Amateur
1984 Junior World Golf Championships (Girls 15-17)

Professional wins

LPGA Tour wins (1)

References

External links

American female golfers
LPGA Tour golfers
Golfers from California
Sportspeople from Fresno, California
1967 births
Living people
21st-century American women